The 1988–89 English Hockey League season took place from October 1988 until April 1989.

A new league format was introduced to English hockey whereby two divisions of sixteen teams would compete in the first and second divisions with promotion and relegation. This replaced the previous format of regional leagues. The Men's National League attracted a sponsor in Poundstretcher and they would commit £300,000 over three years.

The inaugural competition was won by Southgate and the top four teams qualified to take part in the Poundstretcher League Cup tournament which was won by Hounslow.

The Men's Hockey Association Cup was won by Hounslow and the Women's Cup (National Club Championship finals) was won by Ealing.

Men's Poundstretcher National League First Division League Standings

Men's League Cup Tournament 

Hounslow
Veryan Pappin, Simon Hazlitt, Mike Williamson (Tony Diamond sub), Guy Swayne, Jon Potter, David Hacker, Nick Gordon, Andy Ferns, Jon Rees, Robert Thompson, Martyn Grimley
Southgate
Simon Rees, Peter Boxell, Richard Dodds, Mike Spray, James Duthie, Nick Clark, Robert Clift, Steve Batchelor, Paul Moulton (Soma Singh sub), Rupert Welch, Sean Kerly

Men's Nationwide Anglia Cup (Hockey Association Cup)

Quarter-finals

Semi-finals

Final 
(Held at Old Loughtonians, Chigwell on 12 March)

Hounslow
Veryan Pappin, Simon Hazlitt, Mike Williamson, Jon Potter, Guy Swayne, Jon Rees, David Hacker, Martyn Grimley, Andy Ferns, Robert Thompson, Parmi Soor
Bromley
Craig Winter, Miles Richards, Andy King, Jon Gurney, Graeme Barnett, David Coombes, Matthew Cross, Mark Hunnisett, Neil Berry, Darren Willis, Jimmy Henderson

Women's Cup (National Club Championship finals) 
(Held at Southampton from 22–23 April)

Group A

Group B

Semi-finals & Final

References 

1988
field hockey
field hockey
1989 in field hockey
1988 in field hockey